The 1860 United States presidential election in Maine took place on November 2, 1860, as part of the 1860 United States presidential election. Voters chose eight electors of the Electoral College, who voted for president and vice president.

Maine was won by Republican candidate Abraham Lincoln, who won by a margin of 32.82%.

With 62.24% of the popular vote, Maine would prove to be Lincoln's fourth strongest state in terms of popular vote percentage after Vermont, Minnesota and Massachusetts.

Results

See also
 United States presidential elections in Maine

References

1860 Maine elections
1860
Maine